The Ministry of Co-operation is a Ministry of the Government of Maharashtra. 
state. 

The Ministry is headed by a cabinet level Minister. Atul Save''' is Current Minister of Co-operation Government of Maharashtra.

Head office

List of Cabinet Ministers

List of Ministers of State

References 

Government of Maharashtra
Government ministries of Maharashtra